This is a list of episodes of Lopez Tonight, which aired from November 9, 2009, to August 12, 2011, on TBS.

2009

November

December

2010

January

February

March

April

May

June

July

August

September

October

November

December

2011

January

February

March

April

May

June

July

August

References

External links
 

Lists of variety television series episodes